Nouria is a female given name. Notable people with this given name include:

 Nouria Benghabrit-Remaoun (born 1952), Algerian sociologist
 Nouria Hernandez, Swiss biologist
 Nouria Kazdarli (1921–2020), stage name of Algerian actress Khadidja Benaïda
 Nouria Mérah-Benida (born 1970), Algerian athlete
 Nouria Newman (born 1991), French slalom canoeist
 Nouria Salehi, Afghan-Australian nuclear physicist and humanitarian
 Nouria Yamina Zerhouni, Algerian politician

Feminine given names